Roßbach is a municipality in the district of Neuwied, in Rhineland-Palatinate, Germany. It is situated on the river Wied.

The municipality is spelled with an ß which may be replaced by ss if not available (Rossbach).

References

Neuwied (district)